James Francis Doolan (8 October 1888 – 8 October 1944) was an Australian rules footballer who played with St Kilda in the Victorian Football League (VFL).

Notes

External links 

1888 births
1944 deaths
Australian rules footballers from Victoria (Australia)
St Kilda Football Club players